Wilfred Charles "Sonny" Siebert (born January 14, 1937) is a former Major League Baseball right-handed  pitcher from 1964 to 1975. He finished with a record of 140-114 and a 3.21 ERA. He threw a no-hitter on June 10, 1966, against the Washington Senators. He was drafted simultaneously by the Cleveland Indians and the St. Louis Hawks of the NBA.

Amateur career
Siebert attended Bayless Senior High School, and the University of Missouri and played on the 1958 team that lost in the College World Series finals in 12 innings. He was selected to the CWS All Tournament Team that year.

Professional career
Siebert signed with the Cleveland Indians as an outfielder, and it was two years into his minor league career that Indians pitching coach Spud Chandler convinced Siebert to try pitching. Siebert made his debut in 1964, and posted 16 wins in both 1965 and 1966.

On June 10, 1966, Siebert pitched a no-hitter against the Washington Senators. He was third in the American League in earned run average (ERA) in 1967. Siebert had a 12–10 record in his final full year in Cleveland, in 1968. He was traded along with Joe Azcue and Vicente Romo from the Indians to the Boston Red Sox for Ken Harrelson, Dick Ellsworth, and Juan Pizarro on April 19, . Siebert spent five seasons with the Red Sox and was named an All-Star in 1971. He was traded in 1973 to the Texas Rangers, and then played for the St. Louis Cardinals, San Diego Padres, and Oakland Athletics.

Siebert is the most recent American League pitcher to hit two home runs in one game, accomplishing the feat prior to the 1973 introduction of the designated hitter, as a member of the Boston Red Sox on September 2, 1971, against the Baltimore Orioles. He was sent from the Rangers to the Cardinals for Tommy Cruz and cash on October 26, 1973. On September 11, 1974, he was credited with the win in a 25-inning Cardinal win over the New York Mets.  It is the second longest game in innings played in National League history. He was involved in a three-team deal on November 18, 1974 in which he was dealt along with Alan Foster and Rich Folkers from the Cardinals to the Padres for Ed Brinkman who had been sent to San Diego with Bob Strampe and Dick Sharon from the Detroit Tigers for Nate Colbert. Danny Breeden went from the Padres to the Cardinals to subsequently complete the transactions.

As a hitter, Siebert was an occasional home run threat. He posted a .173 batting average (114-for-660) with 52 runs, 12 home runs and 57 RBI. In 1971, as a member of the Red Sox, he batted a career-high .266 (21-for-79) with 6 home runs and 15 RBI, also career highs.

See also

 List of Major League Baseball no-hitters

References

External links

1937 births
Living people
People from Ste. Genevieve County, Missouri
Missouri Tigers baseball players
Missouri Tigers men's basketball players
Baseball players from Missouri
Cleveland Indians players
Boston Red Sox players
Texas Rangers players
St. Louis Cardinals players
San Diego Padres players
Oakland Athletics players
Major League Baseball pitchers
American League All-Stars
Batavia Indians players
Burlington Indians players (1958–1964)
Reading Indians players
Salt Lake City Bees players
Jacksonville Suns players
Charleston Indians players
American men's basketball players